HMS Mameluke was an  which served with the Royal Navy during the First World War. The M class was an improvement on the preceding , capable of higher speeds. The ship, the first Royal Navy vessel to be named after the Mamelukes, a class of ex-slaves that ruled Egypt, was launched in 1915. The destroyer joined the Twelfth Destroyer Flotilla and, although under refit during the Battle of Jutland and so unable to participate, later took part in anti-submarine operations as part of this flotilla, although no submarines were sighted or sunk. The conditions of service in the North Sea meant that the destroyer was soon worn out and, after the armistice, Mameluke was placed in reserve. Despite a service life of only six years, the vessel was decommissioned and, in 1921, sold to be broken up.

Design and development
Mameluke was one of the nine s ordered by the British Admiralty in November 1914 as part of the Second Emergency War Programme. The M class was an improved version of the earlier  destroyers, required to reach a higher speed in order to counter rumoured German fast destroyers. It transpired that the German ships did not exist.

Displacement was  normal and  full load. Three funnels were fitted.

Armament consisted of three single QF  Mk IV guns on the ship's centreline, with one on the forecastle, one aft on a raised platform and one between the middle and aft funnels. Torpedo armament consisted of two twin mounts for  torpedoes. A single QF 2-pounder  "pom-pom" anti-aircraft gun was mounted between the torpedo tubes. After February 1916, for anti-submarine warfare, Mameluke was equipped with two chutes for depth charges. The number of depth charges carried increased as the war progressed. The ship had a complement of 80 officers and ratings.

Construction and career
Mameluke was laid down by John Brown & Company of Clydebank on 23 December 1914 with the yard number 439, launched on 14 August the following year and completed on 30 October. The destroyer was the first vessel in the British navy to be named after the Mamelukes, ex-slaves that formed a powerful military force and founded a Sultanate that ruled Egypt. The ship was deployed as part of the Grand Fleet, joining the newly formed Twelfth Destroyer Flotilla.

Mameluke was undergoing refit in May 1916 and so missed the Battle of Jutland. On 24 August, the vessel, as part of the Twelfth Flotilla, unsuccessfully searched for the German submarine  which had sunk the armed boarding steamer . The flotilla subsequently took part in a large exercise with other flotillas and fleets of the Grand Fleet, led by the dreadnought battleship , between 22 and 24 November. The destroyer was also involved in anti-submarine patrols between 15 and 22 June the following year. Once again, Mameluke did not see or attack any enemy vessels.

The harsh conditions of wartime operations, particularly the combination of high speed and the poor weather that is typical of the North Sea, exacerbated by the fact that the hull was not galvanised, meant that the destroyer was soon worn out from such service. After the Armistice of 11 November 1918 that ended the war, the Royal Navy returned to a peacetime level of strength and both the number of ships and the amount of personnel needed to be reduced to save money.  On 15 October 1919, the destroyer was given a reduced complement and placed in reserve at Devonport. However, this did not last long and, after being decommissioned, on 22 September 1921, Mameluke was sold to G Cohen to be broken up in Germany.

Pennant numbers

References

Citations

Bibliography

 
 
 
 
 
 
 

 
 
 
 
 
 

1915 ships
Admiralty M-class destroyers
Ships built on the River Clyde
World War I destroyers of the United Kingdom